Brookland/Oaklyn is the only collaborative studio album by Alias & Tarsier. It was released on Anticon in 2006.

Critical reception
Brian Howe of Pitchfork gave the album a 7.0 out of 10, saying, "for the bulk of it, Alias stays behind the boards and Tarsier behind the mic, resulting in the most enjoyable music to which the producer's name has ever been attached." Meanwhile, Cameron MacDonald of XLR8R said, "no matter how many tricks Alias has up his sleeve, Tarsier's lullaby voice is not strong enough to carry this record." Marisa Brown of AllMusic gave the album 3.5 stars out of 5, saying: "The album is so close to being fantastic, and knowing the potential that exists is what makes it so frustrating when Brookland/Oaklyn comes up short."

Track listing

Personnel
Credits adapted from liner notes.

 Alias – vocals (3), instruments, production, arrangement, recording, mixing, photography
 Tarsier – vocals, piano (1, 3), bass organ (5), synthesizer (8), effects (8), photography
 Telephone Jim Jesus – guitar (4)
 Matt McCullough – guitar (5, 9), effects (5, 9)
 Kirsten McCord – cello (6)
 Doseone – vocals (8)
 Healamonster – synthesizer (8), effects (8)
 Dax Pierson – organ (9)
 Mitch Osias – vocal recording
 George Horn – mastering
 Baillie Parker – executive production
 Wes Winship – artwork, layout

References

External links
 

2006 albums
Alias & Tarsier albums
Anticon albums